Wangara may refer to:
The Soninke Wangara of West Africa
Wangara, Western Australia
Wangara, Burkina Faso